The Medari massacre was the mass murder of 22 Croatian Serb civilians on 1 May 1995 by members of the Croatian Army (HV) during Operation Flash. On 1 May 1995, according to Zagreb-based NGO Documenta and HHO, the Croatian Army killed 22 civilians, including 11 women and three children, in the village of Medari near Nova Gradiška in western Slavonia. Two sisters, Radmila and Mirjana Vukovic survived the massacre by chance because they went to high school in a nearby town in Bosnia and Herzegovina. Their father, mother and seven-year-old sister were killed that day. As of 2006, no criminal charges were filed in relation to the event.

References

1995 in Croatia
Mass murder in 1995
Massacres in 1995
Croatian war crimes in the Croatian War of Independence
Massacres in Croatia
Massacres of Serbs
History of the Serbs of Croatia
May 1995 events in Europe
Massacres in the Croatian War of Independence